"Stan of Arabia: Part 1" is the fifth episode of the second season and the twelfth overall episode of the animated comedy series American Dad!. It aired on Fox in the United States on November 6, 2005, and is written by Nahnatchka Khan and directed by Rodney Clouden.

When Francine refuses to do all the work, Stan must plan a party for his boss's celebration, with disastrous consequences.

Plot
Stan and his cohorts meet at a park to discuss planning a surprise 25th anniversary celebration for Bullock. Bullock, of course, is spying on them and Stan takes all of the credit for the party idea. Bullock is pleased. At home, Stan tells Francine the good news: she’s in charge of planning Bullock’s party for Saturday. However, that’s the same night that Francine is due to appear in a play. Meanwhile, Hayley and Steve take in the new Michael Moore movie which features him making love to Angelina Jolie. Hayley is outraged by his selling out. On Saturday night, Stan is getting ready for the party, while Francine is dressed for her play. She ignores Stan’s demands, declaring marriage to be an equal partnership. At the party, Stan breaks Jay Leno's neck when he, due to Francine's absence, insinuates to Stan that Francine wears the pants in their family, and has to perform the roast by himself. It goes horribly wrong and Stan is thrown out. Stan sings a song about how he doesn’t want an equal partner, but a wife who will listen to his every demand. In the process, he manages to dance his way into a family's house and trash their dinner.

The next day, Bullock relocates Stan and his family to Saudi Arabia as a punishment for the roast. The family initially enjoy the chance to experience new things, but Roger freaks out upon learning that alcohol is banned in Saudi Arabia. Meanwhile, Stan receives his new mission: overseeing guards protecting a pipeline that’s being built. As the family adjusts to the new culture, Francine finds that she likes the neighboring women although she doesn’t like how they cater to their men. Stan, however, learns about the country’s strict moral codes from his new co-workers and finds that he loves it, especially the ones that involve women. And Steve is thrilled to find out that, not only is he considered a man, he can fire guns whenever he wants. Stan begins throwing orders around but Francine resists. At the same time, Hayley is begging Steve to accompany her to the bazaar so she can leave the house. Roger, hidden in a burka, goes with them. At home that night, Stan introduces Francine to his new second wife. Back at the bazaar, Steve sells Roger to a man who thinks Roger is a woman.

With his new money, Steve buys a Mercedes, sunglasses, grenades, and a bootleg DVD of the Michael Moore documentary from earlier. During a dinner party, Stan enjoys himself with his new friends, even accepting a robe as a gift, while Francine engages in a brutal fight with his second wife. Bullock calls and tells Stan he can have his old job in the States back but Stan says that he likes Saudi Arabia. Meanwhile, the other Smiths are in grave trouble: Steve crashes his Mercedes into an oil derrick in the middle of the desert, Roger is being taken to a remote location by his new husband, Hayley is running from the morality police and Francine is being smacked with the dishwasher by her rival. Stan angrily tells Bullock he renounces his American citizenship and burns the family's passports; he intends to stay on the Arabian peninsula.

Production
The episode aired on Fox in the United States on November 6, 2005, and was written by Nahnatchka Khan and directed by Rodney Clouden. In 2006, during an interview with MovieWeb, Mike Barker and Matt Weitzman named it their favorite of episode of the season, saying: "...it really is tough to pick a favorite. I'm really fond of the "Stan of Arabia" two parter. It was actually intended to be a one-hour special when we kind of pitched the idea to the network. They said, "Go for it! We can do that." And then suddenly it's like, "We can't do that." As a one-hour it was really nice and pure and clean, and now it's a two-parter but I think it still works really well."

Reception
Ryan Budke of AOL TV gave the episode a positive review, saying "Last night's episode was one of the best that I've seen. Stan's musical number about wanting a "wife" and not a "partner" was pretty funny and almost everything in Saudi Arabia was spot-on." The episode was watched by a total of 7.3 million people; this made it the fourth most watched show on Animation Domination that night, losing to King of the Hill, Family Guy and The Simpsons, which had 11.63 million viewers.

This episode, along with its sequel Stan of Arabia: Part 2, was banned by the government of Saudi Arabia, who claimed it was "promoting Islamophobia and anti-Arabism".

References

External links 
 

2005 American television episodes
American Dad! (season 2) episodes
Television episodes set in Saudi Arabia
Animation controversies in television
Race-related controversies in animation
Race-related controversies in television
Television controversies in Saudi Arabia
Television controversies in the United States
Television episodes pulled from general rotation
Polygamy in fiction